Miss Grand Argentina is a national title bestowed upon a woman chosen to represent Argentina at the annual international pageant, Miss Grand International. The title was mentioned for the first time in 2013 when the winner of Reina Nacional del Carnaval, Susel Jacquet, was chosen to represent the country at the inaugural edition of Miss Grand International in Thailand. Since 2021, the right to select Argentinian representatives for the aforementioned international contest has belonged to Iron Tree SRL, a Buenos Aires-based event organizer founded in 2019.

Since the first debutants in 2013, Argentina's representatives have never won the Miss Grand International title.

History

Argentina debuted in Miss Grand International in 2013, but all of the country representatives were appointed to the position, and no preliminary national pageant was explicitly held for Miss Grand International. The franchise license was previously managed by several organizers until a Buenos Aires-based event organizer, Iron Tree SRL, took over the franchise in 2021.

The franchise transfer occurred in 2021, when the former licensee, Marcelo Shaya, was unable to meet the international firm's requirements due to a lack of funds, causing the original representative, Alina Luz Akselrad, to withdraw and be replaced by Florencia de Palo, who was appointed by a new licensee, Iron Tree SRL.

Titleholders
The following is a list of Argentina representatives at the Miss Grand International contest.

References

External links

 

Argentina